The Affirmed Stakes is a Grade III American thoroughbred horse race for three-year-old horses over a distance of  miles on the dirt held at Santa Anita Park in Arcadia, California in late-June.  The race currently offers a purse of $100,000.

History

The inaugural running of the event was on 30 June 1979 at Hollywood Park Racetrack as the Silver Screen Handicap at a distance of  miles and was won by the promising three year old Valdez who won by 10 lengths, which continues to be the longest winning margin in the event.

The event inherited the grading classification which was Grade II from the Argonaut Handicap which some sources believe is the predecessor to the event. However, the former Hollywood Park Media Guide management organization and the current Santa Anita management consider the event to have no connection.

In 1993 the race was renamed to the Affirmed Handicap in honor of the 1978 U.S. Triple Crown champion, Affirmed.

In 1995 the distance of the event was decreased to  miles.

After Hollywood Park Racetrack  was closed in 2013 the race was moved to Santa Anita Park.

In 2020 due to the COVID-19 pandemic in the United States, Santa Anita closed their track and the event was cancelled

Records
Speed record:  
 miles – 1:40.83 General Challenge (1999)
 miles – 1:46.80 Journey At Sea (1982)

Largest margin of victory:
 10 lengths  – Valdez (1979)

Most wins by a jockey:
 5 – Laffit Pincay, Jr. (1979, 1984, 1985, 1990, 1992)

Most wins by a trainer:
 6 – Bob Baffert (1999, 2006, 2011, 2014, 2015, 2019)

Most wins by an owner:
 2 – Karl Watson, Michael E. Pegram & Paul Weitman (2011, 2015)

Winners

Legend:

 
 

Notes:

ƒ Filly or Mare

See also
 List of American and Canadian Graded races

References

Flat horse races for three-year-olds
Horse races in California
Graded stakes races in the United States
Recurring sporting events established in 1979
Santa Anita Park
1979 establishments in California
Grade 3 stakes races in the United States